This article shows the rosters of all participating teams at the men's football tournament at the 2015 Pan American Games in Toronto. Rosters can have a maximum of 18 athletes.

Group A

Brazil

The roster for Brazil was as follows.

Head coach:  Rogério Micale

Canada

Panama
The roster for Panama was as follows.

Head coach:  Leonardo Pipino

Peru

Group B

Mexico

The roster for Mexico was as follows.

Head Coach: Raúl Gutiérrez

Paraguay

<noinclude>

Trinidad and Tobago

The roster for Trinidad and Tobago was as follows.

Uruguay

The roster for Uruguay was as follows.

References

External links
Official Brazil's Team Roster
Official Canada's Team Roster
Official Mexico's Team Roster
Official Panama's Team Roster
Official Paraguay's Team Roster
Official Peru's Team Roster
Official Trinidad and Tobago's Team Roster
Official Uruguay's Team Roster
Official site

Men's team rosters
Pan American Games football squads